Patricia Aznar (born 19 February 1975) is a Spanish former professional tennis player.

Aznar won eight titles during her career on the ITF Women's Circuit, all in doubles, which included a $50k tournament in Barcelona in 1995. She made her only WTA Tour main-draw appearance at the 1996 Madrid Open, partnering Eva Bes in the doubles.

ITF finals

Singles: 4 (4 runner-ups)

Doubles: 14 (8 titles, 6 runner-ups)

References

External links
 
 

1975 births
Living people
Spanish female tennis players